Nikita Lozhkin (born October 13, 1991) is a Russian professional ice hockey goaltender. He is currently playing with Molot-Prikamie Perm of the Higher Hockey League (VHL).

Lozhkin made his Kontinental Hockey League debut playing with Metallurg Novokuznetsk during the 2013–14 KHL season.

References

External links

1991 births
Living people
Metallurg Novokuznetsk players
Russian ice hockey goaltenders
Sportspeople from Perm, Russia